Lucious H. Harris (born December 18, 1970) is an American former professional basketball player who was selected by the Dallas Mavericks in the second round (28th pick overall) of the 1993 NBA draft. Harris has played for the Mavericks, Philadelphia 76ers, New Jersey Nets, and Cleveland Cavaliers in 12 NBA seasons. He played in the 2002 and 2003 NBA Finals as a member of the Nets.

Harris has played in 800 games and has scored a total of 5,784 points in his NBA career. He was selected as Eastern Conference Player of the Week for the week of December 23–29, 2003. He played seven seasons for the New Jersey Nets before being released during the off-season of 2004 due to the team's salary-cap problems. He went on to play for the Cleveland Cavaliers during the 2004–05 season; however, Harris shot 40% from the field and 32% from the 3-point zone while averaging a career-low 4.3 points per game. Following that season, he was released by the Cavaliers in an attempt to get under the salary cap.

On February 3, 2007, Harris's #30 jersey was retired by Long Beach State during halftime of the 49ers' game against the University of the Pacific.  Harris was the school's all-time leading scorer, scoring 2,312 points throughout his career.  In addition, Harris was the school's single-season leading scorer, scoring 739 points in the 1992–1993 season. Lucious was also known for his defense.

External links
NBA.com Profile
Lucious Harris's stats @ Basketball-reference.com

1970 births
Living people
American men's basketball players
Basketball players from Los Angeles
Cleveland Cavaliers players
Dallas Mavericks draft picks
Dallas Mavericks players
Long Beach State Beach men's basketball players
New Jersey Nets players
Philadelphia 76ers players
Shooting guards